Bhalesi is an Indo-Aryan language spoken in the Bhalessa region of Jammu and Kashmir, India. It is a member of the Bhadarwahi group of dialects under the Western Pahari subgroup.

The region mostly takes up two adjacent mountain valleys, with the main settlements being Kahra, Gandoh, Kilhotran, Jakyas, Bhatyas, and Juggasar. The neighbouring languages are Chinali, Pangwali and Chambeali to the south-east, Padri to the north-east, Kishtwari to the north-west, Sarazi to the west, and Bhadarwahi to the south.

Bhalesi  vs. Bhadarwahi  'black').

An unusual feature is found in one of the patterns for the formation of the plural of feminine nouns, adjectives and participles. While some forms add a suffix ( 'a small bee' ->  'small bees'), others will undergo apophony: the final and initial vowels are raised, for example:
  'a small jug' ->  'small jugs'
  'a white ant' ->  'white ants'
  'she went' ->  'they(f) went'

References

Bibliography 

Indo-Aryan languages
Northern Indo-Aryan languages
Languages of Jammu and Kashmir